Prem Shastra is a 1974 Indian Hindi-language film written and directed by B. R. Ishara. The film stars Dev Anand, Zeenat Aman and Bindu.

Plot 
Sagar Sharma (Dev Anand) is a popular author and a favourite among women. During one of his trips to a location to gather inspiration for a plot for his next novel, he autographs one of his previous novels for an admirer called Barkha (Zeenat Aman). Sagar and Barkha fall in love and begin an intimate relationship. Later due to the pressures he faces in his life, Sagar requests Barkha to forget him. Diwan (Asit Sen), who publishes Sagar's novels, informs him that one of his best-sellers was receiving backlashes as it focused on an affair between a father and a daughter, and that it has led many women activists to ask for a ban on the book. Unperturbed, Sagar decides to defy them by moving to court, if necessary.

Sagar returns home and Neelima (Bindu), his wife who is a drunk and spoiled. Both are not in love with each other. Suddenly, Barkha, who is pregnant, visits Nilu. Nilu introduces her to Sagar as her sister. Sagar visits his gynaecologist, who informs him that Barkha is preparing for an abortion. Sagar visits Barkha and requests her not to undergo an abortion. It is revealed that Nilu blackmailed Sagar into marry her. The two then argue, during which Neelima says Barkha is Sagar’s elder brother’s (Abhi Bhattacharya) daughter. A desperate Sagar visits his elder brother to discover Neelima had lied. The climax develops with flashbacks of Neelima’s past when she was Miss India in 1951. She had affairs with three rich people, of which she marries Rajan Arora (Rehman). Desperate to ruin Sagar and Barkha's relationship, Neelima even appoints a hardcore criminal, Lallan (Anwar Hussain), to kill them. A gripping court room climax reveals the truth and Sagar is united with Barkha.

Cast 
Dev Anand as Sagar Sharma
Zeenat Aman as Barkha Arora (Suman)
Bindu as Neelima Sharma
I. S. Johar as Malhotra
Abhi Bhattacharya as Sagar’s elder brother
Asit Sen as Diwan
Anwar Hussain as Lallan
Rehman as Rajan Arora
Anju Mahendru as Barkha Arora
David as Anthony D'Souza

Soundtrack 

The music was composed by Laxmikant–Pyarelal while Anand Bakshi wrote the lyrics. On the album, film critic Suresh Kohli of The Hindu wrote that the songs by Kishore Kumar and Asha Bhosle were "mediocre". He found the title background score to be "memorable".

Reception 
Kohli wrote that if the film was "scripted and filmed sans the sexual angles would have surely hit the bull’s eye at the box office."

References

External links 
 
 Prem Shastra at Bollywood Hungama
 Prem Shastra Full Film on YouTube

1974 films
1970s Hindi-language films
1970s musical drama films
Indian musical drama films
Films directed by B. R. Ishara
1974 drama films